"Umbrella Beach" is a song by American electronica act Owl City. The song was released as the third single from his second album Ocean Eyes. It is the second UK single from the album (as it was decided not to release "Vanilla Twilight" in Europe) and had a May 16, 2010, release date in the US, and was released May 17, 2010, in the UK.

The album cover is a picture of the beach at Santa Monica, California, taken from the Santa Monica Pier. "Umbrella Beach" entered the UK Dance Chart on the chart week of May 8, 2010, at number 25, later  peaking at number 12.

Meaning
Lyrically, Young stated that the song is about ... "a hermit living in a box car on the edge of the shoreline that corroded so badly, it wound up at the bottom of the bay. Rather than finding a new home, the hermit chooses to learn to scuba dive and now spends his days deep under the waves in his boxcar".

Critical reception

Robert Copsey of Digital Spy gave the song a positive review stating, "By essentially re-working the best bits of 'Fireflies' and cranking up the BPM a few notches, Young has fashioned another stellar indie-folk-electro smash that should encourage even the most stubborn toe-tapper to have a jump around." Fraser McAlpine of BBC Radio gave a mixed review giving the song a 3 out of 5 star rating.

Music video
The music video for "Umbrella Beach" premiered on April 16, 2010, on YouTube. The video tells about a boy who is trying to build a plane to cross the sea and go to another island. At the end of the video, a group of his friends help him push the plane down a hill for takeoff. It is not shown whether or not the plane successfully flies. Adam Young did not appear in the music video apart from photos on a table. The video was filmed in Hope Cove, England.

Track listing

Charts

References

2009 songs
2010 singles
Owl City songs
Universal Republic Records singles
Songs written by Adam Young